Tacheometry (from Greek for "quick measure") is a system of rapid surveying, by which the horizontal and vertical positions of points on the earth's surface relative to one another are determined without using a chain or tape, or a separate levelling instrument.
Instead of the pole formerly employed to mark a point, a staff similar to a level staff is used. This is marked with heights from the base or foot, and is graduated according to the form of tacheometer in use.

The horizontal distance is inferred from the vertical angle included between two well-defined points on the staff and the known vertical distance between them. Alternatively, also by readings of the staff indicated by two fixed stadia wires in the diaphragm (reticle) of the telescope. The difference of height is computed from the angle of depression or elevation of a fixed point on the staff and the horizontal distance already obtained. 
The azimuth angle is determined as formerly. Thus, all the measurements requisite to locate a point both vertically and horizontally with reference to the point where the tacheometer is centred are determined by an observer at the instrument without any assistance beyond that of a person to hold the level staff.

The ordinary methods of surveying with a theodolite, chain, and levelling instrument are fairly satisfactory when the ground is relatively clear of obstructions and not very precipitous, but it becomes extremely cumbersome when the ground is covered with bush, or broken up by ravines. Chain measurements then become slow and liable to considerable error; the levelling, too, is carried on at great disadvantage in point of speed, though without serious loss of accuracy. These difficulties led to the introduction of tacheometry.

In western countries, tacheometry is primarily of historical interest in surveying, as professional measurement nowadays is usually carried out using total stations and recorded using data collectors. Location positions are also determined using GNSS.  Traditional methods and instruments are still in use in many areas of the world and by users who are not primarily surveyors.

Tacheometer

A tachymeter or tacheometer is a type of theodolite used for rapid measurements and determines, electronically or electro-optically, the distance to target. The principles of action are similar to those of rangefinders.

Stadia measurements
Other forms of tacheometry in surveying include the use of stadia rods with theodolites or plane-table alidades. These use stadia marks on the instrument's reticle to measure the distance between two points on the stadia rod (the stadia interval). This is converted to distance from the instrument to the stadia rod by multiplying the stadia interval by the stadia interval factor. If the stadia rod is not at the same elevation as the instrument, the value must be corrected for the angle of elevation between the instrument and the rod.

The formula most widely used for finding the distances is:

Generally, the instrument is made so that  and  exactly, to simplify calculations.

Subtense bars

Another device used in tacheometry is the subtense bar. This is a rigid rod, usually of a material insensitive to change in temperature such as invar, of fixed length (typically ). The subtense bar is mounted on a tripod over the station to which the distance is desired. It is brought to level, and a small telescope on the bar enables the bar to be oriented perpendicular to the line of sight to the angle measuring station.

A theodolite is used to measure the angle between indicators on the two ends of the subtense bar. The distance from the telescope to the subtense bar is the height of an isosceles triangle formed with the theodolite at the upper vertex and the subtense bar length at its base, determined by trigonometry.

References

Surveying
Surveying instruments
Measuring instruments
Length, distance, or range measuring devices